Casement cloth is a lightweight sheer fabric made of various fibers used chiefly for curtains.

Weave 
It is possible to make casement cloth with any fine natural or synthetic yarns. The weave structure may vary from plain to figured one. The weave is generally open. The colors are usually white, ivory and cream.

Use 
Casement cloth is mainly used as decorative material in curtains and draperies.

See also 

 Casement window
 Marquisette
 Ninon

References 

Textiles
Net fabrics